The 2002 Finnish Figure Skating Championships took place between December 15 and 16, 2001 in Helsinki. Skaters competed in the disciplines of men's singles, women's singles, and ice dancing on the senior and junior levels. The event was used to help determine the Finnish team to the 2002 European Championships.

Senior results

Men

Ladies

Ice dancing

External links
 results

2001 in figure skating
Finnish Figure Skating Championships, 2002
Finnish Figure Skating Championships
2001 in Finnish sport
2002 in Finnish sport